Julie Anderson is a documentary film maker. On January 24, 2012, she was nominated for an Academy Award for the film God Is the Bigger Elvis.

References

External links

Living people
Year of birth missing (living people)
American documentary filmmakers
Primetime Emmy Award winners